Robert Ostlere is a British actor, best known for his portrayal of Arthur Digby in the medical drama Holby City. He made his first appearance on 2 January 2013 and departed on 7 June 2016.

Early life
Ostlere graduated from the Royal Academy of Dramatic Art in 2008. He prepared for playing a doctor in Holby City by going to a hospital with Ty Glaser and spending the day with a consultant and registrar. He also watched surgery being performed and followed F1 doctors.

Personal life 
Robert Ostlere got engaged to actress Vicki Davids in November 2021. They married on 8th May 2022.

Career
In 2011 Ostlere appeared in the series premiere of the American television series Game of Thrones, appearing as Night's Watch ranger Waymar Royce. He is killed by a White Walker six minutes into the episode's cold open, giving him the distinction of playing the first character ever killed on that show, which is known for its large number of character deaths. On this, Ostlere comments, "To be honest, when you do those smaller parts, you’re just happy to see yourself up there because sometimes those things can get cut".

The National Television Awards longlisted him for best newcomer for his role in Holby City.

Filmography

Film

Television

Theatre

References

External links

Living people
English male film actors
English male soap opera actors
National Youth Theatre members
Alumni of RADA
Year of birth missing (living people)